Eduard Yevhenovych Sarapiy (born 12 May 1999) is a Ukrainian professional footballer who plays as a centre-back for Dnipro-1, on loan from Metalist Kharkiv.

Club career

Early years
Born in Zaporizhzhia, Sarapiy began his youth career at the local Metalurh Zaporizhzhia academy. In 2010, he moved to the Dynamo Kyiv academy.

Metalurh Zaporizhzhia
In 2017 he returned to Metalurh Zaporizhzhia in the Ukrainian Second League.

Metalist Kharkiv
In 2021 he transferred to Metalist Kharkiv in the Ukrainian First League.

Loan to Dnipro-1
The following year he went on loan to Dnipro-1 in the Ukrainian Premier League. He made his debut for Dnipro on 28 August 2022, scoring a goal in a 3–0 victory over Dynamo Kyiv.

International career
Sarapiy made two appearances for the Ukraine national under-17 football team team in 2016. In September 2022, he was called up for the first time to the Ukraine national football team ahead of UEFA Nations League matches against Armenia and Scotland, but he did not appear in either match.

References

External links
 Profile on Metalist Kharkiv official website
 
 

1999 births
Living people
Footballers from Zaporizhzhia
Ukrainian footballers
Ukraine youth international footballers
Association football defenders
FC Tavria-Skif Rozdol players
FC Metalurh Zaporizhzhia players
FC Metalist Kharkiv players
SC Dnipro-1 players
Ukrainian Premier League players
Ukrainian First League players
Ukrainian Second League players